Great Britain participated at the 2017 Summer Universiade, in Taipei, Taiwan.

Medal summary

Medal by sports

Archery

Men

Women

Teams

Athletics

Men's track

Men's field

Women's track

Women's field

Football

Women's tournament 

The women's team participated in Group D and finished in 9th place overall.

Roster

Golf

Gymnastics

Swimming

Tennis

Water polo

Men's tournament

Women's tournament

Weightlifting

References

 Great Britain Overview

External links
Universiade Taipei 2017 

Nations at the 2017 Summer Universiade
2017 in British sport